Isabel Burr (born 7 September 1988), is a Mexican actress. She is known for her main role as Adela Huerta in the MTV series Niñas mal, and for her role as Iara Carranza in the Televisa telenovela Si nos dejan.

Filmography

Film

Television

References

External links 
 

1988 births
Living people
Mexican film actresses
Mexican telenovela actresses
Mexican television actresses
People educated at Centro de Estudios y Formación Actoral
21st-century Mexican actresses
Actresses from Mexico City